Daryl Cumming (born 15 May 1951) is a former Australian rules footballer who played with Richmond, Melbourne, North Melbourne and South Melbourne in the VFL during the 1970s.

Cumming was part of a successful Richmond team and competed in finals every year from his debut season in 1971 to 1975. In that period he played in two Grand Finals, winning one in 1974. A rover mostly, he kicked a career high five goals in a win against the then reigning premiers Hawthorn at Glenferrie Oval in 1972. He finished his career with three single season stints at Melbourne, North Melbourne and South Melbourne.

References

1951 births
Living people
Australian rules footballers from Victoria (Australia)
Richmond Football Club players
Richmond Football Club Premiership players
Melbourne Football Club players
North Melbourne Football Club players
Sydney Swans players
One-time VFL/AFL Premiership players